Dror Zahavi (born 6 February 1959) is an Israeli film director and screenwriter. He has directed more than 25 films and television shows since 1992. His 2008 film, For My Father, was entered into the 30th Moscow International Film Festival.

Selected filmography
 Kissing My Sister (2000, TV film)
  (2005, TV film)
  (2007, TV film)
 For My Father (2008)
  (2009, TV film)
  (2012, TV film)
  (2014, TV film)
  (2016, TV film)

References

External links

1959 births
Living people
Israeli film directors
Israeli male screenwriters
Film people from Tel Aviv